The London Underground mosquito is a form of mosquito in the genus Culex.  It is found in the London Underground railway system as its name suggests, but has a worldwide distribution and long predates the existence of the London Underground. It was first described as a distinct species from Egyptian specimens by the biologist Peter Forsskål (1732–1763). He named this mosquito Culex molestus due to its voracious biting, but later biologists renamed it Culex pipiens f. molestus because there were no morphological differences between it and Culex pipiens.  Notably, this mosquito assaulted Londoners sleeping in the Underground during the Blitz, although similar populations were long known. 

A study from 2004 analyzing DNA microsatellites suggested that Culex molestus is likely a distinct species from Culex pipiens. However, a more recent paper from 2012 argues that it is more accurately "a physiological and ecological variant of Cx. pipiens" and should not be considered a distinct species.

Description

This mosquito, first identified in Egypt in the late 18th century, has been found in underground systems around the world. Some authors suggested that it adapted to human-made underground systems since the last century from local above-ground Culex pipiens, but the more recent evidence suggests it is a southern mosquito variety related to C. pipiens that has adapted to the warm underground spaces of northern cities.

Behavioral evidence for this mosquito being a different species from C. pipiens comes from research by Kate Byrne and Richard Nichols. The species have very different behaviours, are extremely difficult to mate, and with different allele frequencies consistent with genetic drift during a founder event. More specifically, this mosquito, C. molestus, breeds all-year round, is cold intolerant, and bites rats, mice, and humans, in contrast to the above-ground species, which is cold tolerant, hibernates in the winter, and is considered to mostly feed on bird hosts. When the two varieties were crossbred, the eggs were infertile, suggesting reproductive isolation.

Hosts
The mosquito has been documented to feed upon birds.

Parasites
For decades Cx. molestus was known only as a fully competent host of one kind of malaria, Plasmodium garnhami. Only this Plasmodium had been demonstrated to complete sporogony by Garnham 1966. Due to this lack of study a team investigated whether a more common kind of malaria could also go through the life cycle. Žiegytė et al. 2014 find that P. relictum also completes sporogony in Cx. molestus.

Heredity

Genetic data indicate the molestus form in the London Underground appear to have a common ancestry, rather than the population at each station being related to the nearest above-ground population. Byrne and Nichols' working hypothesis was that adaptation to the underground environment had occurred locally in London once only – many hurdles must be overcome to become adapted to the subterranean environment, and understandably it would occur rarely. This hypothesis implies that local adaptation would be expected in different locations around Europe and beyond, as each local population evolved an offshoot that overcame the problems of living underground.

However, more recently collected genetic evidence reported by Fonseca and others suggests a single C. molestus form has spread throughout Europe and beyond, since populations over a large area share a common genetic heritage.  These widely separated populations are distinguished by very minor genetic differences, which suggest the underground form developed recently; a single mtDNA difference is shared among the underground populations of 10 Russian cities, and a single fixed microsatellite difference occurs in populations spanning Europe, Japan, Australia, the Middle East, and the Atlantic islands. This worldwide spread might have occurred after the last glaciations or may be even more recent, due to the insects hitchhiking on world trade routes; one possibility is the international secondhand tire trade. The tires retain water in which the larvae can survive, and completely removing water from an old tire can be difficult.

Also, the Fonseca paper obtained genetic evidence that the recent colonization of America by Culex mosquitoes actually involves a strain derived from a rare successful hybridization between C. pipiens and C. molestus. They suggest hybridization may explain why the American form bites both birds and humans (this interpretation is controversial, see letter from Spielman et al. and the response that follows it in Science). The consequences of this more indiscriminate feeding hit the news in 1999 with the outbreak of human encephalitis in New York, caused by West Nile virus. It was the first documented introduction of this virus into the Western Hemisphere; perhaps because in the longer established populations, the Old World northern above-ground C. pipiens almost exclusively bites birds, with the human-biting ones being incarcerated below ground.

Distribution

Culex molestus has been observed in North and South America, Europe, Asia, Africa, and Australasia. Its country of origin is thought to be Egypt, although it has likely spread via trade and colonial passages over the past centuries.

In the summer of 2011, an invasion of Culex molestus appeared on the Upper West Side in Manhattan, New York City. The mosquito is well known for being commonly found in sewers of New York and thriving throughout the year feeding on humans. Residents of older brownstones found the mosquitoes coming into basements and then through air vents and other openings into their homes. The city government did not make this infestation of the pest a top priority because they tested negative for West Nile virus and because of the high cost of mosquito control.

In Australia, Culex molestus was first recorded in the 1940s, and has since spread across all southern states, causing a significant biting nuisance in urban areas. Unlike most Australian urban mosquitos, molestus is active through all 12 months of the year. Its introduction was likely through military movements into Melbourne during World War II, and genetic studies have indicated its most likely passage was from eastern Asia and Japan. It has also been identified as a potential vector for several Australian blood-borne diseases, such as Ross River virus.

References 

Speciation events
Culex
Diptera of Europe
Urban wildlife
Mosquito
Animals in England
Endemic fauna of England